John Joseph Mulcahy (June 26, 1922 – April 29, 1994) was a Roman Catholic bishop.

Born in Dorchester, Massachusetts, Mulcahy was ordained  to the priesthood on May 1, 1947, for the Roman Catholic Archdiocese of Boston. On December 28, 1974, Mulcahy was appointed titular bishop of Penafiel and auxiliary bishop of the Boston Archdiocese and was ordained on February 11, 1975. He resigned on July 21, 1992.

Notes

1922 births
1994 deaths
Clergy from Boston
20th-century American Roman Catholic titular bishops
Roman Catholic Archdiocese of Boston